Tripura Police is the law enforcement agency of the state of Tripura which organizes and is responsible for policing activities in the state of Tripura, Northeast India. It was formed in the year 1965. Currently V.S. Yadav, IPS is DGP of Tripura.

Administration
The Director General of Police, (DGP), Tripura is the head of Organization who is decorated with an office at Police Headquarters (PHQ) located at Agartala, the capital of Tripura State. There are several Inspector Generals of Police (IGP's) working under him. IGP (Law and Order), IGP (Administration), IGP (AP and OPs), IGP (Intelligence) who are decorated with respective offices at PHQ complex, Agartala. Several DyIGP's (Deputy Inspector General of Police are under the command and control of DGP, Tripura. Most notable DyIGPs are DyIGP (Intelligence), DyIGP (Headquarters), DyIGP (Admin), DyIGP (AP and OPs) and on the operation of Law and Order DyIGP(Southern Range) and DyIGP (Northern Range). Under them are eight District SsPs (Superintendents of Police) for eight districts namely West Tripura District, Sipahijala District, Gomati District, South Tripura District, Dhalai District, Khowai District, Unakoti District and North Tripura District. All such District Superintendents of Police are assisted by respective Additional Superintendents of Police, Deputy Superintendents of Police, (District Intelligence Branch) posted at the District Headquarters, and respective Sub-Divisional Police Officers (Posted at respective sub-division headquarters). Such Sub-Divisional Police Officers supervises and monitors the day-to-day activities and working of Police Stations under them. All the Police Stations are manned with one Officer in Charge (Not below the rank of Sub-Inspectors and not above the rank of Inspectors).

Controversy
The members of the LGBT community alleged that the police officers forced them to strip in front of male and female police officers. The arrested individuals were forced to give an undertaking not to crossdress.

Equipment and vehicles 
All the equipment for the Tripura Police are manufactured indigenously by the Indian Ordnance Factories controlled by the Ordnance Factories Board, Ministry of Defence, Government of India.
 Baton (General Beat Purpose)
 Lee–Enfield . 303 (Standard Issue. Phased out)
 SLR Rifle.
 1B1INSAS Rifle. (Present Standard Issue)
 Sterling submachine gun. (VIP Protection. Phased Out)
 Sten Gun (VIP Protection. Phased Out)
 Akm (For Special Operations) Indian AKM
 AK-47 (VIP Protection & Standard Guards Issue)
 Heckler & Koch MP5 (VIP protection) Limited quantity.
 Bren Light machine gun
 PKM Machine Gun. (Limited Quantity)
 Pistol Auto 9mm 1A (Standard Service Weapon for Officer's above the Rank of Sub-Inspector)
 Glock 17. (Standard Service Weapon for Officer's above the Rank of Sub-Inspector)
 Revolver. (Officer's Service weapon. Being phased out)

Vehicles 
 Toyota Innova (Official Car for High Ranked Officers)
 Mahindra Scorpio (Official Car for High Ranked Officers)
 Tata Safari (VIP Protection & Convoy)
 HM Ambassador (VIP officers)

Vehicles Used for General Duty purpose.
 Mahindra Bolero
 Maruti Gypsy (patrolling)
 Tata Sumo
 Tata 407 Trucks.
 Buses
 TVS Apache. (Patrolling)
 Mahindra Commander. (Phased out)

References

External links
 

Government of Tripura
State law enforcement agencies of India
1965 establishments in Tripura
Government agencies established in 1965